CKBI-TV was a television station in Prince Albert, Saskatchewan, Canada. The station was in operation from 1958 to 2002 as a private affiliate of CBC Television.

History
CKBI was established on January 27, 1958, by Edward Rawlinson, the founder of Rawlco Communications. Although it primarily aired CBC programming, it also broadcast a mixture of local and privately purchased (i.e. syndicated) programming that differed from full network affiliates. From the early 1980s onward, it was piped into Saskatoon by the local cable provider, Telecable (later Shaw Cable).

In 1984, CKBI was purchased by Yorkton Television, the owner of the CKOS/CICC twinstick in Yorkton. It was the sole station in the market at the time of its sale. In 1986, Yorkton Television was acquired by Baton Broadcasting. Although Yorkton held a license to launch CIPA-TV at the time of its sale to Baton, the station did not go on the air until 1987. Later in 1987, CKBI/CIPA joined with CKOS/CICC, CKCK-TV in Regina and CFQC-TV in Saskatoon to form the Saskatchewan Television Network, which in turn merged with Baton's Ontario stations in 1994 to form the Baton Broadcast System.

In 1995, due to cutbacks, CKBI scrapped local newscasts in favour of the CBC News Hour piped in from CBKT in Regina. All the reporters and staff went over to CIPA following the announcement. Baton became sole owner of CTV in 1997 and changed its name to CTV Inc. a year later.

In 2002, CTV sold CKBI and CKOS to the CBC. CKBI signed off for the last time as a separate station on October 27, 2002. Its transmitter became a rebroadcaster of CBKST in Saskatoon under the callsign CBKST-9. CBKST-9 was among 620 translators closed down by the CBC on July 31, 2012, due to budget cuts affecting the network.

CKBI personalities at time of the news department ceasing operations 
 Leslie Brown CKBI 11:30 News Anchor
 Harold Duffy CKBI News Reporter
Lara Hurrell CKBI/CIPA News Reporter/Videographer
 Alyson Edwards CKBI 5:30 News Anchor
 Shaun Frenette CKBI Noon Show Anchor/Substitute CKBI News at 5:30 Anchor
 Jamie Killingsworth CKBI Substitute Sports Anchor/Reporter
 Bob Krawchuk CKBI Sports Anchor/Reporter
 Cory Longley CKBI News Reporter/Substitute CKBI News at 5:30 Weather
 Don Mitchell CKBI News at 5:30 Weather
 Dale Neufeld CKBI News Reporter
 Wayne Paskaruk CKBI 5:30 News Anchor

References

External links
 

KBI
KBI
Television channels and stations established in 1958
Mass media in Prince Albert, Saskatchewan
Television channels and stations disestablished in 2002
KBI-TV
1958 establishments in Saskatchewan